Domenico Pignatelli di Belmonte (19 November 1730 – 5 February 1803) was an Italian Cardinal of the Roman Catholic Church.

Biography
Prince Don Domenico Pignatelli di Belmonte was born on 19 November 1730 in Naples, Italy, the son of Princess Donna Anna Francesca, Princess of Belmonte in her own right and 1st Princess of the Holy Roman Empire (since 1726) by marriage.  She was daughter and heiress of the 5th Prince, and as such was a Grandee of Spain 1st Class, 5th Duchess of Acerenza, 8th Marchioness of Galatone, 5th Countess of Copertino, 7th Baroness of Badolato, Signore di Veglie, Leverano, San Cosimo etc.  Prince Don Domenico Pignatelli di Belmonte's father was Prince Don (Giuseppe) Antonio Pignatelli y Aymerich, who was also 2nd Marquess of San Vicente and 3rd Marquess of Argençola, and General of the Imperial Cavalry.  He was General Commander of the Austrian Army at the Battle of Bitonto in 1734, during the War of Polish Succession, and was created a Knight of the Golden Fleece (Ritter des Orden vom Goldenen Vlies) in 1735, a Knight of the Order of Santiago (Orden de Santiago) and a Knight of the Illustrious Royal Order of St. Januarius (L'Insigne Reale Ordine di San Gennaro) (both in 1765).

Domenico Pignatelli di Belmonte's aunt on his father's side, Doña Marianna, Countess of Althann, was lady in waiting to the Empress Elizabeth, consort of Emperor Charles VI and the mother of Empress Maria Theresa of Austria.

Domenico Pignatelli di Belmonte was ordained priest as a member of the Congregation of Clerks Regular of the Divine Providence (The Theatines), as Father Domenico Pignatelli on 22 September 1753.  He was appointed Lector of Sacred Canons in the House of Studies of SS. Apostoli, Naples, on 12 December 1755.  Thereafter he was appointed, variously, Secretary to the Superior General, Superior of SS. Apostoli, Procurator General, and Co-Adjustor to Father Antonio Francesco Vezzosi, the Superior General of the Theatine Order, on 31 May 1774.  He was himself appointed Superior General on 22 April 1777.  He was appointed as Examiner of those appointed to Ecclesiastical Chairs.

In his Episcopate, he was elected Bishop of Caserta and chosen as Assistant at the Pontifical Throne on 25 February 1782. He was subsequently consecrated Bishop on 3 March 1782 in Rome, at the church of San Silvestro al Monte, by Cardinal Innocenzo Conti, Secretary of the Chancery of Apostolic Briefs, who was assisted in the ceremony by Girolamo Volpi, Titular Archbishop of Neocesarea, and by François de Pierre de Bernis, Titular Bishop of Apollonia, Vicar General of Albi.  Bishop Domenico was General of the Congregation of Clerks Regular of the Divine Providence (The Theatines).  He was promoted to the Metropolitan See of Palermo and Monreale on 29 March 1802, and received the pallium on the same day.  He was Viceroy of Sicily, 1802-1803 (styled as 'President of the Kingdom and Captain General'), during the brief reign of King Ferdinand IV.  He was created a Cardinal Priest in the consistory of 9 August 1802, and received the red biretta on 5 December 1802, in the chapel of the Seminary of Palermo.  He was created a cardinal in place of Paulo Luis Silva, assessor of the Supreme Sacred Congregation of the Roman and Universal Inquisition, who had been created and reserved In pectore in the consistory of 23 February 1801 and died before his name was published.

Cardinal Domenico was Grand Prior of the Sacred Military Constantinian Order of Saint George, and held the rank of Knight Grand Cross of that Order.  He was Knighted in the Illustrious Royal Order of St. Januarius (L'Insigne Reale Ordine di San Gennaro).

Cardinal Domenico died of gout before receiving the red hat and title of his cardinalate, and was buried in the church of the Congregation of Clerks Regular of the Divine Providence (The Theatines), in Palermo.

References

 Additional sources 
LeBlanc, Jean, Dictionnaire biographique des cardinaux du XIXe siècle : contribution à l'histoire du Sacré Collège sous les potificats de Pie VII, Léon XII, Pie VIII, Grégoire XVI, Pie IX et Léon XIII, 1800–1903. Montréal : Wilson & Lafleur, 2007.
Ritzler, Remigium, and Pirminum Sefrin. Hierarchia Catholica Medii et Recentioris Aevi. Volumen VI (1730–1799). Patavii : Typis et Sumptibus Domus Editorialis "Il Messaggero di S. Antonio" apud Basilicam S. Antonii, 1958, p. 152
Ritzler, Remigium, and Pirminum Sefrin. Hierarchia Catholica Medii et Recentioris Aevi. Volumen VII (1800–1846). Patavii : Typis et Sumptibus Domus Editorialis "Il Messaggero di S. Antonio" apud Basilicam S. Antonii, 1968, pp. 8 and 298.

1730 births
1803 deaths
18th-century Neapolitan people
19th-century Italian cardinals
Bishops of Caserta
Viceroys of Sicily
Knights of the Golden Fleece
18th-century Italian Roman Catholic bishops
House of Pignatelli
Cardinals created by Pope Pius VII